Piovese S.S.D.AR.L. is an Italian association football club located in Piove di Sacco, Veneto. It currently plays in Eccellenza.

History
The club promoted from Eccellenza after playoffs in 2006, with Filippo Maniero as its most representative player, but relegated from Serie D in its debut year in the division, after losing a one-legged playoff to Reno Centese.

Colors and badge
Its colors are red and white.

External links
Official site

Football clubs in Italy
Association football clubs established in 1919
Football clubs in Veneto
S.S.D. Piovese